Bahawalpur Railway Station (Urdu and ) is located in Bahawalpur city, Bahawalpur district, Punjab province, Pakistan at the elevation of 385 ft. It is a major railway station of Pakistan Railways on Karachi-Peshawar main line.

The station is staffed and has advance and current reservation offices. Food stalls are also located on it platforms.

In 2016 the Railways Minister Khawaja Saad Rafique announced that Rs280 million will be spent on the construction of Bahawalpur Model Railway Station.

Train routes
The routes are Bahawalpur from linked to Karachi, Lahore, Rawalpindi, Peshawar, Quetta, Multan, Faisalabad, Sargodha, Sialkot, Gujranwala, Hyderabad, Sukkur, Jhang, Rahim Yar Khan, Nawabshah, Attock, Sibi, Khanewal, Gujrat, Rohri, Jacobabad, and Nowshera.

Train services from Bahawalpur
The following trains serve this station:

See also
 List of railway stations in Pakistan
 Pakistan Railways

References

Railway stations in Bahawalpur District
Buildings and structures in Bahawalpur
Railway stations on Karachi–Peshawar Line (ML 1)
Tourist attractions in Bahawalpur
Year of establishment missing